Moegamat Yusuf Maart (born 17 July 1995) is a South African soccer player who plays as an attacking midfielder for South African Premier Division club Kaizer Chiefs and the South Africa national team.

Club career

Orlando Pirates
Maart was born in Cape Town, and grew up in Atlantis. He was scouted by Orlando Pirates in 2016 after being named player of the tournament at that year's SAB U-21 national championships. He initially joined the club's reserve team, but made his first team debut on 12 March 2017 as a substitute in their 3–1 win over EC Bees in the Nedbank Cup. He made his league debut later that season as a substitute in a 2–1 defeat to Lamontville Golden Arrows on 27 May 2017. Maart spent the 2018–19 season on loan with Cape Umoya United, where he scored once in 16 league matches. He was released by Pirates in summer 2020.

Sekhukhune United
Maart joined Sekhukhune United of the National First Division after he was released by Pirates. He played a pivotal role in the club's promotion to the South African Premier Division that season, scoring three times in 28 league appearances.

International career
Maart was called up to the South African national team squad for the 2021 COSAFA Cup. He scored his first international goal on 16 July 2021 in a COSAFA Cup semi-final victory over Mozambique, and played in the final as Maart won the tournament following a 6–5 penalty shoot-out victory over Senegal. He made 6 appearances and scored one goal during the 2021 COSAFA Cup.

References

External links

1995 births
Living people
Sportspeople from Cape Town
South African soccer players
South Africa international soccer players
Association football midfielders
Orlando Pirates F.C. players
Cape Umoya United F.C. players
Sekhukhune United F.C. players
Kaizer Chiefs F.C. players
South African Premier Division players
National First Division players